This list of the Paleozoic life of Kansas contains the various prehistoric life-forms whose fossilized remains have been reported from within the US state of Kansas and are between 538.8 and 252.17 million years of age.

A

 †Acanthocladia
 †Acanthocladia guadalupensis
 †Acanthocladia lepidodendroides
   †Acanthodes
 †Acanthopecten
 †Acanthopecten carboniferous
 †Achistrum
 †Achistrum brownwoodensis
 †Acitheca
 †Acitheca polymorpha
 †Aclisina
 †Acratia
 †Acratia typica
  †Acrodus – tentative report
 †Acroplous
 †Acroplous vorax
 †Actiobates – type locality for genus
 †Actiobates peabodyi – type locality for species
 †Aculeispores
 †Aculeispores variabilis
 †Adlatipora
 †Agassizodus
 †Agassizodus variabilis
 †Agetopanorpa – type locality for genus
 †Agetopanorpa maculata – type locality for species
 †Aglaocrinus
 †Aglaocrinus cranei – type locality for species
 †Ahrensisporites
 †Aibolitus
 †Aibolitus minutus – type locality for species
 †Alatisporites
 †Alatisporites hexalatus
   †Alethopteris
 †Alethopteris grandini
 †Alethopteris serlii
 †Alethopteris sullivanti
 †Alisporites
 †Alisporites plicatus
 †Alisporites zapfei
 †Alloiopteris
 †Allorisma
 †Allorisma altirostrata – type locality for species
 †Amelacanthus
 †Ameura
 †Ameura missouriensis
 Ammodiscus – tentative report
 †Amphiscapha
 †Amphiscapha muricata
 †Amphissites
 †Amphissites centronotus
 †Amphissites dattonensis
 † Ananias – tentative report
 †Ananias welleri – type locality for species
 †Anapiculatisporites
 †Anapiculatisporites grandensis
 †Anapiculatisporites grundensis
 †Anelcana – type locality for genus
 †Anelcana dilatata – type locality for species
 †Anematina
 †Angulisporites
 †Angulisporites splendidus
   †Annularia
 †Annularia asteris
 †Annularia mucronata
 †Annularia vernensis
 †Anomalogramma – type locality for genus
 †Anomalogramma parva – type locality for species
 †Anormochorista – type locality for genus
 †Anormochorista oligoclada – type locality for species
 †Anthracomartus
 †Anthraconeilo
 †Anthraconeilopis
 †Anthraconeilopis kansana
 †Anthraconeilopsis – tentative report
 †Anthraconeilopsis kansana
 †Anthracospirifer
 †Anthracospirifer occiduus
 †Antiquatonia
 †Antiquatonia portlockianus
 †Apheloneura – type locality for genus
 †Apheloneura amplia – type locality for species
 †Apheloneura minutissima – type locality for species
 †Aphlebia
 †Apiculatasporites
 †Apiculatasporites compactus
 †Apiculatasporites latigranifer
 †Apiculatasporites setulosus
 †Apiculatasporites spinulistratus
 †Apiculatisporites
 †Apographiocrinus
 †Apsidoneura – type locality for genus
 †Apsidoneura flexa – type locality for species
 †Araeonema
 †Araucarites – tentative report
 Archaeolithophyllum
 †Archaeophiomusium
 †Archaeophiomusium burrisi
  †Archaeovenator – type locality for genus
 †Archaeovenator hamiltonensis – type locality for species
 †Archelytron – type locality for genus
 †Archelytron superbum – type locality for species
 †Archescytina – type locality for genus
 †Archescytina kansasensis – type locality for species
 †Archescytina muiri – type locality for species
 †Archescytina permiana – type locality for species
 †Archimylacris
 †Archimylacris recta – type locality for species
 †Aristoceras
 †Aristoceras caddoense – or unidentified comparable form
 †Artinska – type locality for genus
 †Artinska clara – type locality for species
 †Artinska ovata – type locality for species
 †Artinska sellardsi – type locality for species
 †Artinskia
 †Artinskia whortani – type locality for species
 †Artisia
 †Astartella
 †Astartella concentrica
 †Asterophyllites
 †Asterophyllites equisetiformis
 †Asterophyllites longifolius
 †Asterotheca
 †Asterotheca arborescens
 †Asterotheca hemiteloides – or unidentified comparable form
 †Asterotheca miltoni – or unidentified comparable form
 †Asthenohymen – type locality for genus
 †Asthenohymen affinis – type locality for species
 †Asthenohymen dunbari – type locality for species
 †Asthenohymen gracilis – type locality for species
 †Asthenohymen kansasensis – type locality for species
 †Asthenohymen pusillus – type locality for species
 †Asthenohymen stenobasis – type locality for species
 †Asthenohymen stigmatizans – type locality for species
 †Atava – type locality for genus
 †Atava ovata – type locality for species
 †Aurikirkbya
 †Aurikirkbya canyonensis
 †Aurikirkbya wymani – type locality for species
 †Aviculipinna – tentative report
  †Aviculopecten
 †Aviculopecten arctisulcatus
 †Aviculopecten mccoyi – type locality for species
 †Aviculopecten nodocosta
 †Aviculopecten nodocostata
 †Aviculopecten occidentalis
 †Aviculopecten peculiaris – type locality for species
 †Aviculopecten rectilaterarius
 †Aviculopecten sumnerensis – type locality for species
 †Aviculopinna
 †Aviculopinna peracuta
 †Axophyllum –

B

 †Bactrites
 Bairdia
 †Bairdia beedei – type locality for species
 †Bairdia chasae – type locality for species
 †Bairdia crassa
 †Bairdia florenaensis
 †Bairdia folgeri
 †Bairdia forakerensis – type locality for species
 †Bairdia garrisonensis
 †Bairdia geisi – type locality for species
 †Bairdia grahamensis – type locality for species
 †Bairdia hassi
 †Bairdia hoffmanae – type locality for species
 †Bairdia hooverae – type locality for species
 †Bairdia hurwitzi
 †Bairdia kansasensis – type locality for species
 †Bairdia kanwakensis – type locality for species
 †Bairdia nevensis – type locality for species
 †Bairdia perincerta – type locality for species
 †Bairdia pompilioides
 †Bairdia powersi – type locality for species
 †Bairdia pseudoglennensis – type locality for species
 †Bairdia radlerae – type locality for species
 †Bairdia reussiana
 †Bairdia seminalis
 †Bairdia symmetrica
 †Bairdia verwiebei – type locality for species
 †Bairdia whortani – type locality for species
 †Balteosporites
 †Balteosporites minutus
 †Basslerella – type locality for genus
 †Basslerella crassa – type locality for species
 †Basslerella firma – type locality for species
 †Basslerella obesa – type locality for species
 †Basslerella rothi – type locality for species
  †Belantsea – or unidentified comparable form
 †Belantsea occidentalis
  †Bellerophon
 †Bellerophon graphicus – type locality for species
 †Bellerophon singularis – type locality for species
 †Blattelytron – type locality for genus
 †Blattelytron permianum – type locality for species
 †Blattinopsis
 †Blattinopsis kukalovae – type locality for species
 †Blattoidea
 †Blattoidea juvenis – type locality for species
 †Bobbodus
 †Bobbodus schaefferi
 †Boesites
 †Boesites texanus
  †Botryococcus
 †Botryococcus braunii
 †Bradyina
 †Bransonella
 †Bucanopsis
 †Bythiacanthus
 Bythocypris
 †Bythocypris osagensis – type locality for species

C

 †Cadiospora
 †Cadiospora magna
   †Calamites
 †Calamites cistii
 †Calamocarpon
 †Calamocarpon insignis
 †Calamospora
 †Calamospora breviradiata
 †Calamospora flexilis
 †Calamospora hartungiana
 †Calamospora mutabilis
 †Calamospora pedata
 †Calamospora pusilla
 †Calamospora straminea
 †Callipteris
 †Callipteris conferta
 †Callipteris curretiensis – or unidentified comparable form
 †Callipteris flabellifera
 †Callipteris goepperti – or unidentified comparable form
 †Callipteris jutieri – or unidentified comparable form
 †Callipteris lyratifolia – tentative report
 †Callipteris oxydata
 †Callipteris scheibei
 †Callipteris subauriculata
 †Callipteris whitei
 †Callistophyton
 †Calvertiella – type locality for genus
 †Calvertiella permiana – type locality for species
 †Camptotaxineura – type locality for genus
 †Camptotaxineura ephialtes – type locality for species
 †Camptotriletes
 †Cancrinella
 †Cancrinella boonensis
 †Carbonita – tentative report
 †Carbonita tumida
 †Carinostrobus – type locality for genus
 †Carinostrobus foresmani – type locality for species
 †Carpolithes
  †Caseodus
 †Caseodus eatoni
 †Caulopteris
 †Cavellina
 †Cavellina chasensis – type locality for species
 †Cavellina edmistonae
 †Cavellina fittsi – type locality for species
 †Cavellina marmorea – type locality for species
 †Cavellina nebrascensis
 †Centonites
 †Centonites symmetricus
 †Chaenomya
 †Chaenomya leavenworthensis – tentative report
 †Chaetetes
 †Chaetetes milleporaceous
 †Chelopterum
 †Chelopterum peregrinum
 †Chomatodus
 †Chonetella
 †Chonetella flemingi
 †Chonetes
 †Chonetes decipiens
 †Chonetes euampygus
 †Chonetes lioderma
 †Chonetes mesoloba
 †Chonetina
 †Chonetina flemingii
 †Chonetinella
 †Choristosialis – type locality for genus
 †Choristosialis enigmatica – type locality for species
 †Cibolocrinus
 †Circulichnis
 †Circulichnis montanus
 †Cirratriradites
 †Cirratriradites annulatus
 †Cirratriradites annuliformis
 †Cirratriradites maculatus
  †Cladodus
  Cladophlebis
 †Cladophlebis tenuis – or unidentified comparable form
 †Clavicosta – type locality for genus
 †Clavicosta echinata – type locality for species
  †Cleiothyridina
 †Cleiothyridina orbicularis
 †Climacammina
 †Clinopistha
 †Colpites – tentative report
 †Colpites monilifera
 †Columinisporites
 †Columinisporites ovalis
 †Complexisporites
 †Complexisporites polymorphus
  †Composita
 †Composita elongata
 †Composita ovata
 †Composita subtilita
 †Condranema
 †Condranema magna
 †Condranema parvula
 †Condrathyris
 †Condrathyris perplexa
 †Converrucosisporites
 †Convolutispora
 †Convolutispora venusta
 †Cooleyella
 †Cooleyella quinqueloba – type locality for species
 †Cooleyella simplex – type locality for species
 †Cooperella
 †Cooperella striata – type locality for species
 †Cordaianthus
 †Cordaianthus pitcairniae – or unidentified comparable form
 †Cordaicarpus
  †Cordaites
 †Cordaites principalis
 †Cordaitina
 †Cornigella
 †Cornigella binoda – type locality for species
 †Cornigella parva – type locality for species
 †Corniops – type locality for genus
 †Corniops mapesii – type locality for species
 †Coryellina
 †Coryellina firma – type locality for species
 †Crassispora
 †Crassispora kosankei
 †Crinoedischia – type locality for genus
 †Crinoedischia buttsi – type locality for species
 †Cristatisporites
 †Crurithyris
 †Crurithyris expansa
 †Crurithyris planoconvexa
 †Crurithyris subtilita
 †Cryptoscorpius – type locality for genus
 †Cryptoscorpius americanus – type locality for species
  †Ctenacanthus
 †Ctenacanthus amblyxiphias
 †Cyathus
 †Cyathus ulrichi
 †Cycadospadix
 †Cyclogranisporites
 †Cyclogranisporites aureus
 †Cyclogranisporites microgranus
 †Cyclogranisporites minutus
 †Cyclogranisporites obliquus
 †Cyclogranisporites orbicularis
 †Cyclogranisporites staplinii
  †Cyclopteris
 †Cyclotrypa
 †Cyclotrypa pelagia
 †Cymatospira
 †Cymatospira montfortianus
 †Cyphoneura – type locality for genus
 †Cyphoneura permiana – type locality for species
 †Cyphoneurodes
 †Cyphoneurodes reducta – type locality for species
 †Cypridellina
 †Cypridellina newelli – type locality for species
 †Cystodictya –

D

 †Dasyleptus – type locality for genus
 †Dasyleptus artinskianus – type locality for species
 †Dasyleptus sharovi – type locality for species
 †Delocrinus
 †Delocrinus admirensis
 †Delocrinus vulgatus
 †Delopsocus
 †Delopsocus elongatus – type locality for species
 †Delopsocus fasciatus – type locality for species
 †Delopsocus kansanum – type locality for species
 †Delopterum – type locality for genus
 †Delopterum latum – type locality for species
 †Delopterum minutum – type locality for species
 †Deltodus
 †Deltodus angularis – or unidentified comparable form
 †Deltoidospora
 †Deltoidospora adnata
 †Deltoidospora gracilis
 †Deltoidospora grandis
 †Deltoidospora levis
 †Deltoidospora priddyi
 †Deltoidospora pseudolevis
 †Deltoidospora smithii
 †Deltoidospora sphaerotriangula
 †Deltoidospora subadnatoides
 †Deltoidospora subintorta
 †Demopterum
 †Demopterum gracile
 †Dendroidichnites
 †Dendroidichnites irregulare
 †Densosporites
 †Densosporites sphaerotriangularis
  †Dentalium
 †Dentalium kansasense
 †Derbyia
 †Derbyia crassa
 †Derbyia cymbula
 †Derbyia cymula
 †Derbyia hooserensis
 †Derbyia wabaunseensis
 †Desmiodus
 †Desmoinesia
 †Desmoinesia muricatina
 †Desmoinesia nana
 †Desmoinsea
 †Dibuniphyllum
 †Dibunophyllum
 †Dichentomum – type locality for genus
 †Dichentomum complexum – type locality for species
 †Dichentomum grande – type locality for species
 †Dichentomum latum – type locality for species
 †Dichentomum minimum – type locality for species
 †Dichentomum parvulum – type locality for species
 †Dichentomum tinctum – type locality for species
 †Dichophyllum
 †Dichophyllum moorei
 †Dicksonites
 †Dicksonites pluckenetii
 †Dictyoclostus
 †Dictyomylacris – type locality for genus
 †Dictyomylacris multinervis – type locality for species
 †Dielasma
 †Dielasma bovidens
 †Dinoblatta
 †Dinoblatta scudderi – type locality for species
   †Diplichnites
 †Diplichnites gouldi
 †Diplopodichnus
 †Diplopodichnus biformis
 †Ditaxineura – type locality for genus
 †Ditaxineura anomalostigma – type locality for species
 †Ditaxineura cellulosa
 †Ditomopyge – tentative report
 †Ditomopyge decurtata
 †Ditomopyge scitulus – tentative report
 †Donaldina
 †Doter – type locality for genus
 †Doter minor – type locality for species
 †Ductilodon – type locality for genus
 †Ductilodon pruitti – type locality for species
 †Dunbarella
 †Dunbarella striata
 †Dunbaria – type locality for genus
 †Dunbaria fasciipennis – type locality for species

E

 †Echinaria
 †Echinaria moorei
 †Echinoconchus
 †Echinoconchus semipunctatus
 †Economolopsis
 †Economolopsis anodontoides – tentative report
   †Edestus
 †Edestus heinrichi – or unidentified comparable form
 †Edmondia
 †Edmondia nebrascensis
 †Elibatocrinus
 †Ellipsella
 †Ellipsella distenta – type locality for species
 †Elmoa – type locality for genus
 †Elmoa trisecta – type locality for species
 †Elmoboria – type locality for genus
 †Elmoboria piperi – type locality for species
 †Elmopterum – type locality for genus
 †Elmopterum rotundum – type locality for species
 †Elmothone – type locality for genus
 †Elmothone martynovae – type locality for species
 †Elytroneura
 †Elytroneura permiana
 †Emilites
 †Emilites incertus
 †Endelocrinus
 †Endelocrinus rotundus
 †Endosporites
 †Endosporites globiformis
 †Endosporites plicatus
 †Endothyra
 †Enteletes
 †Enteletes hemiplicata
 †Eoasianites
    †Eocasea – type locality for genus
 †Eocasea martini – type locality for species
 †Eohaptodus
 †Eohaptodus garnettensis – type locality for species
 †Eolissochonetes
 †Eoryodus
  †Eoscopus – type locality for genus
 †Eoscopus lockardi – type locality for species
 †Erisocrinus
 †Etoblattina
 †Etoblattina coriacea – type locality for species
 †Etoblattina fulva – type locality for species
 †Etoblattina obscura – type locality for species
 †Euchondria
 †Euchondria pellucida – tentative report
 †Euchoroptera – type locality for genus
 †Euchoroptera longipennis – type locality for species
 †Euconcordia – type locality for genus
 †Euconcordia cunninghami – type locality for species
 †Euconospira
 †Euonychocrinus
 †Euphemites
 †Euphemites carbonarius
 †Euphemites graffhami – type locality for species
 †Euphemites regulatus – type locality for species
 †Euprioniodina
 †Exocrinus
 †Exoriocrinus –

F

 †Fabalicypris
 †Fabalicypris acetalata
 †Fabalicypris glennensis
 †Fabalicypris hoxbarensis
 †Fenestella
 †Fenestella artior
 †Fenestella cruciformis
 †Fenestella gaptankensis
 †Fenestella mimica
 †Fenestrellina
 †Filiramoporina – type locality for genus
 †Filiramoporina kretaphilia – type locality for species
 †Fimbrinia
 †Fissodus
 †Fissodus dentatus – type locality for species
 †Fistulipora
 †Fistulipora carbonaria
 †Fistulipora incrustans
 †Florinites
 †Florinites mediapudens
 †Florinites millotti
 †Florinites similis
 †Florinites triletus
 †Florinites visendus
 †Florinites volans
 †Foveosporites
 †Foveosporites insculptus
 
 †Fusulina
 †Fusulina cylindrica

G

 †Galateacrinus
 †Garnettius
 †Garnettius hungerfordi – type locality for species
 †Geinitzina
 †Gelasopteron – type locality for genus
 †Gelasopteron gracile – type locality for species
  †Gervillia
 †Gervillia longa – or unidentified comparable form
 †Girtycoelia
 †Glabrocingulum
 †Glabrocingulum grayvillense
 †Glaphyrites
 †Glaphyrites welleri
 †Glaphyrophlebia – type locality for genus
 †Glaphyrophlebia ovata – type locality for species
 †Glaphyrophlebia speciosa – type locality for species
 †Glaukosocrinus
 †Glenopteris
 †Glenopteris lineata
 †Glenopteris lobata
 †Glenopteris splendens
 †Glenopteris sterlingi
  †Glikmanius
 †Glikmanius occidentalis
 †Globovalvulina
 †Glyptopleura
 †Glyptopleura triserta
 †Gomphostrobus
 †Goniasma
 †Goniasma lasallense
 †Gonioglyphioceras
 †Gonioloboceras
 †Gonioloboceras goniolobus
 †Gordia
 †Gordia indianaensis
 †Graffhamicrinus
 †Graffhamicrinus magnificus
 †Graffhamicrinus profundus – type locality for species
 †Graffhamicrinus waughi – or unidentified comparable form
 †Granasporites
 †Granasporites medius
 †Granulatisporites
 †Granulatisporites adnatoides
 †Granulatisporites granularis
 †Granulatisporites granulatus
 †Granulatisporites livingstonensis
 †Granulatisporites microgranifer
 †Granulatisporites minutus
 †Granulatisporites pallidus
 †Granulatisporites pannosites
 †Granulatisporites parvus
 †Granulatisporites verrucosus
 †Graphiocrinus
 †Graphiocrinus kansasensis
 †Gunnellodus
 †Gunnellodus bellistriatus – type locality for species

H

 †Haenoblattina – type locality for genus
 †Haenoblattina rarinervis – type locality for species
 †Haenoblattina tenuis – type locality for species
 †Hamiapollenites
 †Hamiltonichthys – type locality for genus
 †Hamiltonichthys mapesi – type locality for species
 †Hammondella – type locality for genus
 †Hammondella crassa – type locality for species
 †Hammondella globosa – type locality for species
 †Haworthina – type locality for genus
 †Haworthina bulleta
 †Healdia
 †Healdia compressa – type locality for species
 †Healdia cuneata
 †Healdia parallela – type locality for species
 †Healdia simplex
 †Healdia winfieldensis
 †Helminthoidichnites
 †Helminthoidichnites tenius
   †Helminthopsis
 †Helminthopsis heiroglyphica
 †Heslerodus
 †Heslerodus divergens
 †Hesperoherpeton – type locality for genus
 †Hesperoherpeton garnettense – type locality for species
 †Heteroptilon – type locality for genus
 †Heteroptilon costale – type locality for species
 †Hollinella
 †Hollinella burlingamensis – type locality for species
 †Hollinella cushmani – type locality for species
 †Holmesella
 †Holmesella crassa – type locality for species
 †Holmesella quadrata
 †Homocladus – type locality for genus
 †Homocladus grandis – type locality for species
 †Hpyselentoma
 †Hpyselentoma perhumerosa
 †Hustedia
 †Hustedia mormoni
    †Hybodus
 †Hypermegethes
 †Hypermegethes pilchi – type locality for species
 †Hystriculina
 †Hystriculina hystricula
 †Hystriculina wabashensis

I

  †Ianthasaurus – type locality for genus
 †Ianthasaurus hardestiorum – type locality for species
 †Ianthinopsis
 †Ianthodon – type locality for genus
 †Ianthodon schultzei – type locality for species
 †Illinites
 †Illinites unicus
 †Imitoceras
 †Imitoceras grahamense
 †Isogramma
 †Isogramma millepunctata –

J

  †Janassa
 †Jedria
 †Jedria ventrica
 †Jonesina
 †Jonesina howardensis – type locality for species
 †Jonesina primitioides
 †Juresania
 †Juresania nebrascensis2

K

 †Kallimorphocrinus
 †Kansasia – type locality for genus
 †Kansasia pulchra – type locality for species
 †Kansasoedischia
 †Kansasoedischia maculata – type locality for species
  †Kawichthys – type locality for genus
 †Kawichthys moodiei – type locality for species
 †Kellettella
 †Kellettella navicula
 †Kellettina
 †Kellettina robusta – type locality for species
 †Kennedya – type locality for genus
 †Kennedya mirabilis – type locality for species
 †Kennedya reducta – type locality for species
 †Kennedya tillyardi – type locality for species
 †Kenomagnathus – type locality for genus
 †Kenomagnathus scotti – type locality for species
 †Kewaneesporites
 †Kewaneesporites patulus
 †Kindlella
 †Kindlella minuta
 †Kirkbya
 †Kirkbya clarocarinata
 †Kirkbya firma – type locality for species
 †Kirkbya moorei – type locality for species
 †Kirkbya pergrandis – type locality for species
 †Kirkbya punctata – type locality for species
 †Kirkbya valida – type locality for species
 †Kirkella
 †Kirkella elliptica – type locality for species
 †Knightina
 †Knightina ampla – type locality for species
 †Knightina bassleri – type locality for species
 †Knightina harltoni – type locality for species
 †Knightina incurva – type locality for species
 †Knightina texana
 †Knightinella
 †Knightinella humerosa – type locality for species
 †Knightites – type locality for genus
 †Knightites multicornutus – type locality for species
 †Knoxisporites
 †Knoxisporites stephanephorus
  †Kouphichnium
 †Kouphichnium isp.
 †Kozlowskia
 †Kozlowskia splendens
 †Kutorginella
 †Kutorginella lasallensis – or unidentified comparable form

L

 †Laevigatosporites
 †Laevigatosporites desmoinesensis
 †Laevigatosporites globosus
 †Laevigatosporites medius
 †Laevigatosporites moinesensis
 †Laevigatosporites ovalis
 †Laevigatosporites vulgaris
 †Lagarodus
 †Lagarodus angustus
 †Latosporites
 †Latosporites minutus
 †Lawrenciella – type locality for genus
 †Lawrenciella schaefferi – type locality for species
 †Lebachia
 †Lebachia garnettensis
 †Lebachia lockardii
 †Lecopterum – type locality for genus
 †Lecopterum delicosum – type locality for species
 †Lecorium – type locality for genus
 †Lecorium elongatum – type locality for species
 †Lecythiocrinus
 †Lemmatophora – type locality for genus
 †Lemmatophora typa – type locality for species
 †Lepetopsis
 †Lepetopsis peregrina – type locality for species
   †Lepidodendron
 †Leptalosia
 †Leptalosia ovalis
 †Limitisporites
 †Limitsporites
 †Lindstroemella – tentative report
  †Lingula
 †Lingula carbonaria
 †Lingula osagensis
 †Linipalus
 †Linipalus magnispinus
 †Linoproductus
 †Linoproductus insinuatus
 †Linoproductus magnispina
 †Linoproductus prattenianus
 †Linopteris
 †Linopteris neuropteroides – or unidentified comparable form
 †Liomopterum – type locality for genus
 †Liomopterum elongatum – type locality for species
 †Liomopterum ornatum – type locality for species
 †Liomopterum sellardsi – type locality for species
 †Lisca – type locality for genus
 †Lisca minuta – type locality for species
 †Lissochonetes
 †Lissochonetes geinitzianus
 †Lissochonetes geroniticus
 †Lissochonetes geronticus
  †Lissodus
  †Listracanthus
 †Listracanthus hystrix
 †Lithopanorpa
 †Lithopanorpa pusilla – type locality for species
  Lithophaga
 †Lithopsocidium – type locality for genus
 †Lithopsocidium permianum – type locality for species
 †Lithoscytina – type locality for genus
 †Lithoscytina cubitalis – type locality for species
 †Lophamplexus
 †Lophamplexus brevifolius
 †Lophamplexus phractus – type locality for species
 †Lophamplexus ulius – type locality for species
 †Lophamplexus vagus
 †Lophamplexus westii
 †Lophophyllidium
 †Lophophyllidium absitum – type locality for species
 †Lophophyllidium compressum
 †Lophophyllidium distortum – type locality for species
 †Lophophyllidium hadrum
 †Lophophyllidium profundum
 †Lophophyllidium wewokanum
 †Lophophyllum
 †Lophotriletes
 †Lophotriletes commissuralis
 †Lophotriletes copiosus
 †Lophotriletes gibbosus
 †Lophotriletes ibrahimii
 †Lophotriletes microsaetosus
 †Lophotriletes mosaicus
 †Lophotriletes pseudaculeatus
 †Lophotriletes rarispinosus
 †Lycodus – type locality for genus
 †Lycodus garretti – type locality for species
 †Lycospora
 †Lycospora brevijuga
 †Lycospora granulata
 †Lycospora micropapillata
 †Lycospora ovalis
 †Lycospora pellucida
 †Lycospora pusilla
 †Lycospora rotunda
  †Lysorophus –

M

 Macrocypris
 †Macrocypris garrisonensis
 †Macrocypris menardensis
 †Mapesites – type locality for genus
 †Mapesites chautauquaensis – type locality for species
 †Marginifer
 †Marginifer wabashensis
 †Marginifera
 †Marginifera wabashenis
 †Mariopteris
 †Marmolatella
 †Marmolatella subovata
 †Martynovia – type locality for genus
 †Martynovia insignis – type locality for species
 †Martynovia protohymenoides – type locality for species
 †Meekechinus – type locality for genus
 †Meekechinus elegans – type locality for species
 †Meekella
 †Meekella striaticostata
 †Meekella striatocostata
 †Meekopora
 †Meekopora prosseri
 †Meekoporella
 †Meekoporella dehiscens
 †Meekospira
 †Megactenopetalus
 †Megactenopetalus kaibabanus
 †Meganeuropsis – type locality for genus
 †Meganeuropsis permiana – type locality for species
 †Megatypus – type locality for genus
 †Megatypus ingentissimus – type locality for species
 †Megatypus parvus – type locality for species
 †Megatypus schucherti – type locality for species
 †Megatypus vetustus – type locality for species
 †Megelytron – type locality for genus
 †Megelytron robustum – type locality for species
 †Mesolobus
 †Mesoptilus
 †Mesoptilus carpenteri – type locality for species
  †Metacoceras
 †Michelinia – tentative report
 †Microantyx
 †Microantyx permiana – type locality for species
 †Microcheilinella
 †Microcheilinella inflata – type locality for species
 †Microreticulatisporites
 †Microreticulatisporites concavus
 †Microreticulatisporites harrisonii
 †Microreticulatisporites nobilis
 †Microreticulatisporites noblis
 †Microreticulatisporites sulcatus
 †Millerella
 †Millerella inflata
 †Minilya
 †Minilya binodata
 †Mirandaichnium
 †Mirandaichnium famatinense
 †Misthodotes – type locality for genus
 †Misthodotes biguttatus – type locality for species
 †Misthodotes delicatulus – type locality for species
 †Misthodotes obtusus – type locality for species
 †Misthodotes ovalis – type locality for species
  †Modiolus
 †Monoceratina
 †Monoceratina lewisi
 †Monopteria
 †Monopteria gibbosa
 †Mooreisporites
 †Mooreisporites inusitatus
 †Mooreoceras
 †Moorites
 †Moorites minutus
 †Muensteroceras
 †Multithecopora
 †Murospora
 †Murospora kosankei
 †Myalina
 †Myalina meeki – type locality for species
 †Myalina swallowi
 †Mylacris
 †Mylacris latissima – type locality for species

N

  †Naticopsis
 †Neoaganides
 †Neoaganides grahamensis
 †Neochonetes
 †Neochonetes granulifer
 †Neodimorphoceras
 †Neodimorphoceras texanum
 †Neospirifer
 †Neospirifer cameratus
 †Neospirifer dunbari
 †Neospirifer kansasensis
  †Neuropteris
 †Neuropteris auriculata – tentative report
 †Neuropteris odontopteroides
 †Neuropteris ovata
 †Neuropteris permiana
 †Neuropteris scheuchzeri
  †Noeggerathia
 †Norwoodia
 †Norwoodia angustum
 Nucula
 Nuculana
 †Nuculopsis
 †Nugonioneura – type locality for genus
 †Nugonioneura problematica – type locality for species

O

 †Odonopteris
 †Odonopteris minor
 †Odontopteris
 †Odontopteris brardii
 †Odontopteris excelsa
 †Oligotypus – type locality for genus
 †Oligotypus tillyardi – type locality for species
 †Omphalotrochus
 †Omphalotrochus obtusispira
 †Omphalotrochus wolfcampensis
  †Ophiacodon – type locality for genus
 †Ophiacodon hilli – type locality for species
 †Opisthocladus – type locality for genus
 †Opisthocladus arcuatus – type locality for species
 †Opisthocladus strictus – type locality for species
 †Opter – type locality for genus
 †Opter brongniartii – type locality for species
 †Orbiculoidea
 †Orbiculoidea capuliformis
 †Orbiculoidea missouriensis
 †Orbiculoidea tenulineata – or unidentified comparable form
  †Orodus
   †Orthacanthus
 †Orthomyalina
 †Orthomyalina slocomi
 †Orthomyalina subquadrata
 †Orthopsocus – type locality for genus
 †Orthopsocus singularis – type locality for species
 †Osagia –

P

 †Pachytesta
 †Palaeocaudina
 †Palaeocaudina kansasensis
 †Palaeolima
 †Palaeolima retifera – tentative report
 †Palaeoneilo
  †Palaeoniscus
 †Palaeopisthacanthus
 †Palaeopisthacanthus vogelandurdeni – type locality for species
 †Palaeostachya
 †Palaeostachya andrewsii
 †Palaeostachys
 †Palaeostachys andrewsii
 †Palaeostylus
 †Paleolimulus – type locality for genus
 †Paleolimulus signatus – type locality for species
 †Paleoscytina – type locality for genus
 †Paleoscytina brevistigma – type locality for species
 †Paleostachya
 †Paleuthygramma
 †Paleuthygramma acuta – type locality for species
 †Paleyoldia
 †Paleyoldia subscitula
 †Parablattelytron – type locality for genus
 †Parablattelytron delicatum – type locality for species
 †Parablattelytron elongatum – type locality for species
 †Parablattelytron latum
 †Parablattelytron rectum – type locality for species
 †Parablattelytron subincisum – type locality for species
 †Parabrodia – type locality for genus
 †Parabrodia carbonaria – type locality for species
 †Paracladus – type locality for genus
 †Paracladus retardatus – type locality for species
 †Paraconularia
 †Paragassizocrinus
 †Parajuresania
 †Parajuresania nebrascensis
 †Parallelodon
 †Paramphicrinus
 †Paraparchites
 †Paraparchites humerosus
 †Paraparchites magnus – type locality for species
 †Paraparchites perminutus – type locality for species
 †Paraparchites punctatus – type locality for species
 †Paraprisca – type locality for genus
 †Paraprisca fragilis – type locality for species
 †Paraprisca grandis – type locality for species
 †Paroedischia – type locality for genus
 †Paroedischia recta – type locality for species
 †Parvispina – type locality for genus
 †Parvispina harpago – type locality for species
  †Pecopteris
 †Pecopteris bucklandi – tentative report
 †Pecopteris geinitzi – or unidentified comparable form
 †Pecopteris hemitelioides
 †Pecopteris pinnatifida
 †Pecopteris polymorpha
 †Pecopteris unita
 †Penniretepora
 †Penniretepora auernigiana
 †Penniretepora curvula – type locality for species
 †Penniretepora flexistriata – type locality for species
 †Penniretepora nodocarinata – type locality for species
 †Penniretepora nodolineata – type locality for species
 †Penniretepora pustulosa
 †Pennoceras – tentative report
 †Permelytron – type locality for genus
 †Permelytron schucherti – type locality for species
 †Permelytropsis – type locality for genus
 †Permelytropsis cubitalis – type locality for species
 †Permembia – type locality for genus
 †Permembia delicatula – type locality for species
 †Permoberotha – type locality for genus
 †Permoberotha villosa – type locality for species
 †Permobiella – type locality for genus
 †Permobiella perspicua – type locality for species
 †Permoblattina – type locality for genus
 †Permoblattina curta – type locality for species
 †Permoblattina permiana – type locality for species
 †Permohymen – type locality for genus
 †Permohymen schucherti – type locality for species
 †Permoneura – type locality for genus
 †Permoneura lameerei – type locality for species
 †Permopanorpa
 †Permopanorpa formosa – type locality for species
 †Permopanorpa inaequalis – type locality for species
 †Permopanorpa schucherti – type locality for species
 †Permophorus
 †Permophorus oblongus
 †Permophorus subcostata – or unidentified comparable form
 †Permophorus subcostatus
 †Permopsocus – type locality for genus
 †Permopsocus latipennis – type locality for species
 †Permopsocus ovatus – type locality for species
 †Permopsylla – type locality for genus
 †Permopsylla americana – type locality for species
 †Permopsylla anomala – type locality for species
 †Permopsylla grandis – type locality for species
 †Permopsylla minuta – type locality for species
 †Permopsylla permiana – type locality for species
 †Permoraphidia – type locality for genus
 †Permoraphidia americana – type locality for species
 †Permoraphidia grandis – type locality for species
 †Pernopecten
 †Pernopecten aviculatus
  †Petalodus
 †Petalodus allegheniensis
 †Petalodus arcuatus
 †Petalodus jewetti – type locality for species
 †Petalodus ohioensis
 †Petrelcana – type locality for genus
 †Petrelcana elongata – type locality for species
 †Petrocrania
 †Petrocrania modesta
 †Petrodus
 †Petrodus patelliformis
  †Petrolacosaurus – type locality for genus
 †Petrolacosaurus kansensis – type locality for species
 †Phanerotrema
 †Pharkidonotus
 †Pharkidonotus percarinatus
 †Phasmatocycas
 †Phasmatocycas kansana
 †Phenopterum – type locality for genus
 †Phenopterum elongatum – type locality for species
 †Phestia
 †Phestia arata
 †Phillipsia – tentative report
 †Phricodothyris
 †Phyloblatta – type locality for genus
 †Phyloblatta brevicubitalis – type locality for species
 †Phyloblatta compacta – type locality for species
 †Phyloblatta curtula – type locality for species
 †Phyloblatta curvata – type locality for species
 †Phyloblatta fulvana – type locality for species
 †Phyloblatta fulvella – type locality for species
 †Phyloblatta fusca – type locality for species
 †Phyloblatta kansasia – type locality for species
 †Phyloblatta lawrenceana – type locality for species
 †Phyloblatta lugubris – type locality for species
 †Phyloblatta magna – type locality for species
 †Phyloblatta occidentalis – type locality for species
 †Phyloblatta savagei – type locality for species
 †Phyloblatta separanda
 †Phymatopleura
 †Phymatopleura brazoensis – or unidentified related form
 †Physonemus
 †Physonemus asper
 †Physonemus mirabilis
 †Pilosisporites
 †Pilosisporites aculealatus
 †Pinnatopora
 †Pityosporites
 †Plagioglypta
   †Platyceras
 †Platychorista – type locality for genus
 †Platychorista venosa – type locality for species
 †Platysaccus
 †Platysaccus saarensis
    †Platysomus
 †Platysomus swaffordae – type locality for species
 †Plaxocrinus
 †Plaxocrinus gloukosensis – or unidentified comparable form
 †Pleisiogramma – type locality for genus
 †Pleisiogramma medialis – type locality for species
  Pleurotomaria
 †Plummericrinus
 †Poacordaites
 †Poacordaites linearis
 †Polaricyclus
 †Polaricyclus ballardensis – type locality for species
 †Polidevcia
 †Polidevcia arata
 †Polypora
 †Polypora aestacella
 †Polypora elliptica
 †Polypora endoi
 †Polypora fujimotoi
 †Polypora gigantea
 †Polypora moorei
 †Polypora submarginata
 †Polytaxis
 †Potonieisporites
 †Potonieisporites elegans
 †Potonieisporites novicus
 †Potonieisporites simplex
 †Prismopora
 †Prismopora triangulata
 †Probnis – type locality for genus
 †Probnis speciosa – type locality for species
 †Progoneura – type locality for genus
 †Progoneura minuta – type locality for species
 †Progonopsocus – type locality for genus
 †Progonopsocus permianus – type locality for species
 †Promartynovia – type locality for genus
 †Promartynovia venicosta – type locality for species
 †Promytilus
 †Promytilus vetulus
 †Properrinites – type locality for genus
 †Properrinites plummeri – type locality for species
 †Prosaites – type locality for genus
 †Prosaites compactus – type locality for species
 †Prosaites secundus – type locality for species
 †Protelytron – type locality for genus
 †Protelytron angustum – type locality for species
 †Protelytron dunbari – type locality for species
 †Protelytron furcatum – type locality for species
 †Protelytron permianum – type locality for species
 †Protelytropsis – type locality for genus
 †Protelytropsis grandis – type locality for species
 †Protembia – type locality for genus
 †Protembia permiana – type locality for species
 †Protereisma – type locality for genus
 †Protereisma arcuatum – type locality for species
 †Protereisma elongatum – type locality for species
 †Protereisma insigne – type locality for species
 †Protereisma latum – type locality for species
 †Protereisma permianum – type locality for species
 †Protereisma sellardsi – type locality for species
 †Protochorista – type locality for genus
 †Protochorista tetraclada – type locality for species
 †Protohaploxipinus
 †Protohymen – type locality for genus
 †Protohymen elongatus – type locality for species
 †Protohymen permianus – type locality for species
 †Protohymen readi – type locality for species
 †Protohymen tenuis – type locality for species
 †Protopanorpa – type locality for genus
 †Protopanorpa permiana – type locality for species
 †Pryg – type locality for genus
 †Pryg absurdus – type locality for species
 †Pseudaktubites
 †Pseudaktubites stainbrooki
 †Pseudobigalea
 †Pseudobythocypris
 †Pseudobythocypris pediformis
 †Pseudofusulina
 †Pseudofusulina delicata – type locality for species
 †Pseudomonotis
 †Pseudomonotis hawni – type locality for species
 †Pseudoparaparchites – type locality for genus
 †Pseudoparaparchites kansensis – type locality for species
 †Pseudorthoceras
 †Pseudorthoceras knoxense
 †Pseudozygopleura
 †Psoroptera – type locality for genus
 †Psoroptera cubitalia – type locality for species
 †Ptychocarpus
 †Ptychocarpus candolliana
 †Ptychocarpus feminaeformis
 †Ptychocarpus unitus
 †Ptylopora
 †Punctatisporites
 †Punctatisporites chapelensis
 †Punctatisporites compactus
 †Punctatisporites flavus
 †Punctatisporites glaber
 †Punctatisporites grandivermiculatus
 †Punctatisporites minutus
 †Punctatisporites obesus
 †Punctatosporites
 †Punctatosporites compactus
 †Punctatosporites glaber
 †Punctatosporites granifer
 †Punctatosporites minutus
 †Punctospirifer
 †Punctospirifer kentuckensis
 †Pustulatisporites
 †Pycnoblattina –

Q

 †Quasillinites
 †Quasillinites diversiformis

R

 †Raistrickia
 †Raistrickia abdita
 †Raistrickia aculeata
 †Raistrickia aculeolata
 †Raistrickia crinita
 †Raistrickia crocea
 †Raistrickia rubida
 †Raistrickia subcrinita
 †Rectifenestella
 †Rectifenestella tenax
 †Reticulatia
 †Reticulatia huecoensis
 †Reticulatisporites
 †Reticulatisporites muricatus
 †Reticulitriletes
 †Reticulitriletes clatriformis
 †Reticulitriletes falsus
 †Reticulitriletes reticulocingulum
 †Retispira
 †Retispira tenuilineata
 †Retispira textiliformis
 †Rhabdocarpus
 †Rhabdomeson
 †Rhipidomella
 †Rhipidomella carbonaria
 †Rhombopora
 †Rhombopora lepidodendroides
 †Rhynchopora
 †Rhynchopora magnicosta
 †Roundyella
 †Roundyella simplicissima

S

 †Samaropsis
 †Samaropsis fluitans
 †Sandalodus – or unidentified comparable form
 †Sandrewia
 †Sandrewia texana
 †Sansabella
 †Sansabella bolliaformis
 †Savitrisporites
 †Savitrisporites majus
 †Schistoceras
 †Schizoblattina
 †Schizoblattina minor – type locality for species
 †Schizoblattina schucherti – type locality for species
 †Schizodus
 †Schizodus ovatus – tentative report
 †Schizodus wheeleri
 †Schizophoria
 †Schizopteris
 †Schizopteris trichomanoides – or unidentified comparable form
 †Schubertella
 †Schubertella kingi
 †Schutzia
 †Schutzia anomala – or unidentified comparable form
 †Scolecopteris
 †Scolecopteris elegans
 †Secarisporites
 †Secarisporites remotus
 †Sellardsula – type locality for genus
 †Sellardsula cordata – type locality for species
 †Sellardsula radialis – type locality for species
 †Semopterum
 †Semopterum venosum
 †Septimyalina
 †Septimyalina burmai
 †Septimyalina perattenuata
 †Septimyalina scitula
 †Septopora
 †Septopora spinulosa
 †Serratodus – or unidentified comparable form
 †Shansiella
 †Shenzhousia
 †Shenzhousia readi – type locality for species
 †Shleesha
 †Shleesha pinguis
 †Shumardella
   †Sigillaria
 †Sigillaria brardii
 †Sigillariostrobus
 †Sigillariostrobus hastatus
 †Silenites
 †Silenites lenticularis
 †Soleniscus
 †Spackmanites
 †Spackmanites ellipticus
 †Spackmanites habibii
 †Spermopteris
 †Spermopteris coriacea
  †Sphenophyllum
 †Sphenophyllum oblongifolium
 †Sphenophyllum obovatum
 †Sphenophyllum stoukenbergi – or unidentified comparable form
 †Sphenophyllum thonii – or unidentified comparable form
  †Sphenopteris
 †Sphenopteris germanica – or unidentified comparable form
 †Sphenopteris obtusiloba
 †Sphenopteris suessi
 †Spiloblattina
 †Spiloblattina lawrenceana – type locality for species
 †Spiloblattina laxa – type locality for species
 †Spiloblattina variegata
  †Spinoaequalis – type locality for genus
 †Spinoaequalis schultzei – type locality for species
 †Spinofenestella
 †Spinofenestella spinulosa
 †Spinosporites
 †Spinosporites exiguus
  †Spirifer
 †Spirifer matheri
 †Spirifer rockymontanus – tentative report
  Spirorbis
 †Stegocoelia
 †Stegocoelia quadricarinata
 †Stellarocrinus
 †Stemmatodus
 †Stenopoceras
 †Stenopoceras cooperi – type locality for species
 †Stenzonotriletes
 †Stereopterum
 †Stereopterum breve – type locality for species
 †Stereopterum maculosum – type locality for species
 †Stereopterum rotundum
 †Stereostylus
 †Stereostylus annae – type locality for species
 †Stereostylus milichus – type locality for species
 †Stereostylus perversus – type locality for species
 †Stereostylus phainus – type locality for species
 †Stiallia
 †Stiallia pilosa
 †Stiaria
 †Stiaria intermedia
 †Streblochondria – tentative report
 †Streblochondria tenuilineata
 †Streptognathodus
 †Streptognathodus acuminatus – type locality for species
 †Streptognathodus elongatus – type locality for species
 †Streptognathodus farmeri – type locality for species
 †Streptognathodus flangulatus – type locality for species
 †Streptognathodus pawhuskaensis
 †Streptognathodus simplex – type locality for species
 †Streptognathodus wabaunsensis – type locality for species
 †Streptognathodus walteri – type locality for species
 †Streptognathodus zethus
 †Streptorhynchus
 †Streptorhynchus affine
 †Striatites
 †Striatites richteri
 †Striatoabietites
 †Striatopodocarpites
 †Striatosaccites – type locality for genus
 †Striatosaccites tractiferinus
 †Striomonosaccites
 †Strophostylus – type locality for genus
 †Strophostylus girtyi – type locality for species
 †Subarrectocrinus
 †Subarrectocrinus perexcavatus
 †Sublobalocrinus
 †Sublobalocrinus kasseri
 †Subprioniodus
 †Sulcella
 †Sulcella sulcata
 †Synarmocrinus
 †Synarmocrinus iatani
 †Syringoclemis
 †Syringoclemis wrefordensis – type locality for species
  †Syringopora
 †Sysciophlebia
 †Sysciophlebia arcuata – type locality for species

T

 †Tabulipora
 †Tabulipora bullata – or unidentified comparable form
 †Tabulipora carbonaria
 †Tabulipora hispida – or unidentified comparable form
 †Taeniaesporites
 †Taeniopteris
 †Taeniopteris angelica
 †Taeniopteris coriacea
 †Taeniopteris multinervis
 †Tapopterum
 †Tapopterum celsum
 †Teguliferina
 †Teguliferina armata
 †Tenuacaptor – type locality for genus
 †Tenuacaptor reiszi – type locality for species
 †Terpnocrinus
 †Tetrataxis
 †Therates – type locality for genus
 †Therates planus – type locality for species
 †Thymospora
 †Thymospora obscura
 †Thymospora pseudothiessenii
 †Tococladus – type locality for genus
 †Tococladus rallus – type locality for species
 †Tonganoxichnus
 †Tonganoxichnus buildexensis
 †Tonganoxichnus ottawensis
 †Torispora
 †Torispora securis
 †Trachopteryx – type locality for genus
 †Trachopteryx martynovi – type locality for species
 †Trachydomia
 †Trachydomia wheeleri – tentative report
 †Trecospira
 †Trepospira
 †Trepospira discoidalis – type locality for species
   †Treptichnus
 †Treptichnus bifurcus
 †Treptichnus pollardi
 †Tribolbina – type locality for genus
 †Tribolbina permiana – type locality for species
 †Trigonocarpus
 †Triletes
 †Triquitrites
 †Triquitrites additus
 †Triquitrites bransonii
 †Triquitrites crassus
 †Triquitrites exiguus
 †Triquitrites minutus
 †Triquitrites sculptilis
 †Triquitrites spinosus
 †Triquitrites subspinosus
 †Triticites
 †Triticites brownvillensis – type locality for species
 †Triticites confertus
 †Triticites eoextenta
 †Triticites pointensis
 Trypetesa
 †Trypetesa caveata
 †Trypetesa lampas – type locality for species
 †Tupus – type locality for genus
 †Tupus permianus – type locality for species

U

 †Uddenoceras
 †Ullmannia
 †Ulocrinus
 †Ulocrinus fistulosus – type locality for species
 †Uncinulina
 †Uncinulina lunata – type locality for species
 †Undichna
 †Undichna britannica
 †Undichna simplicitas
 †Urba – type locality for genus
 †Urba punctata – type locality for species

V

 †Verrucosisporites
 †Verrucosisporites donarii
 †Verrucosisporites microtuberosus
 †Verrucosisporites verrocosus
 †Verrusosisporites
 †Verrusosisporites microruberosus
 †Vesicaspora
 †Vesicaspora schaubergeri
 †Vesicaspora wilsonii
 †Vestigisporites
 †Vestispora
 †Vestispora fenestrata
 †Vestispora foveata
 †Vidrioceras
 †Vidrioceras conlini
 †Volsellina
 †Volsellina subelliptica
 †Voltzia
 †Vosellina
 †Vosellina subelliptica

W

   †Walchia
 †Walchia filiciformis – or unidentified comparable form
 †Walchia piniformis
 †Walchia schneideri
 †Warthia
 †Warthia kingi – type locality for species
 †Wellerella
 †Wellerella cooperi
 †Wellerella delicatula – or unidentified comparable form
 †Wellerella osagensis
 †Wellerella tetrahedra
 †Wellerella truncata
 †Wilkingia
 †Wilkingia terminale
 †Williamsella
 †Williamsella striata – type locality for species
 †Williamsella typicalis
 †Wilsonites
 †Wilsonites circularis
 †Wilsonites delicatus
 †Wilsonites vesicatus
 †Worthenia

X

 †Xyrospondylus
 †Xyrospondylus ecordi – type locality for species

Y

 Yoldia
 †Yoldia subscitula

Z

 †Zygopleura

References
 

Paleozoic
Kansas